The Maine Mariners are a professional ice hockey team in the ECHL that began play in the 2018–19 season. Based in Portland, Maine, the team plays their home games at Cross Insurance Arena. The team participate in the North Division of the Eastern Conference. The team replaced the American Hockey League's Portland Pirates after the franchise became the Springfield Thunderbirds in 2016.

History
On May 23, 2016, the Portland Pirates' franchise was sold and relocated to Springfield, Massachusetts, and became the Springfield Thunderbirds. A team of investors headed by former Pirates executives W. Godfrey Wood and Brad Church—the latter a former Portland player as well—announced their intentions to put an ECHL team in Portland to fill the void, joining as early as 2017. However, progress to attain a franchise by the Portland group stalled until four groups, none of which involved Wood, submitted their own proposals at the end of February 2017. By March 8, the arena owners had narrowed their choices to the proposals submitted by Spectra and National Sports Services, with both groups having been involved with managing ECHL teams in their past.

In June 2017, Comcast Spectacor, Spectra's parent company and the operators of the Cross Insurance Arena and the NHL's Philadelphia Flyers – the founders and NHL affiliate for years of the original Maine Mariners AHL franchise in Portland – purchased the franchise rights of the recently dormant Alaska Aces of the ECHL. The league approved of the sale and relocation of the franchise to Portland on June 15. Philadelphia Flyers president Paul Holmgren will serve as the team's governor with former player Danny Briere overseeing the day-to-day operations. In August 2017, the team announced their five finalists for a team name: the Mariners, Watchmen, Lumberjacks, Puffins, and Wild Blueberries. The name was announced as the Mariners on September 29. On November 29, the Mariners' logo and color scheme were revealed. On February 17, 2018, the Mariners hired Riley Armstrong as head coach and Keith Rosenberg as on-ice assistant coach. On April 9, 2018, the Mariners announced they would be affiliated with the NHL's New York Rangers.

The new Mariners played their first game on October 13, 2018, a 6–3 loss to the Adirondack Thunder. Their inaugural game was at home with a reported attendance of 5,291.

Due to the COVID-19 pandemic, the Mariners voluntarily suspended operations for the 2020–21 ECHL season. On June 30, 2021, the Mariners entered an affiliation agreement with the NHL's Boston Bruins and their AHL affiliate, the Providence Bruins, beginning with the 2021–22 season. The Bruins were the affiliate of the original AHL Mariners from 1987 to 1992 when they relocated the Mariners' franchise to Providence. In August 2021, head coach Armstrong was hired by the Philadelphia Flyers as an assistant coach with the Lehigh Valley Phantoms in the AHL and was replaced by the University of Maine men's hockey assistant coach and former NHL player Ben Guite.

On April 16, 2022, the Mariners clinched their first-ever playoff berth thanks to the Worcester Railers dropping their game to the Trois-Rivières Lions in OT and the Mariners beating the Newfoundland Growlers after Can Askew and Matthew Santos scored in the shootout and Stefanos Lekkas stopped both Newfoundland shots. Santos scored the OT winner the night before to set up the control of their own destiny in terms of clinching the final playoff spot in the North Division. 
 
In their first-ever playoff game in team history, the Mariners lost to the Reading Royals with a final score of 3-2, being down 3-0 heading into the final period. The second game of the playoff series against Reading was the same as the first, Reading jumping out to a 3-0 lead before the end of the second period, this time holding on to shut out the Mariners 3-0. With the Mariners finding themselves down 2 games to coming back to the Cross Insurance, the Mariners knew what they were up against. The Mariners came back to win Game 3, 5-4, and Game 4, 4-0, and Matthew Santos got the winning goal in game 3 with 2:26 remaining in the 3rd. The royals would then come back to win the series, winning game 5 in the Cross Insurance by a final score of 3-2 and game 6 at Santander by a final score of 2-1. The 2021-22 season was the best that the Mariners had in franchise history.

Season-by-season records
{| class="wikitable" style="text-align:center"
|-
!colspan=10|Regular season
!colspan=5|Playoffs
|-
! Season !! GP !! W !! L !! OTL !! SOL !! Pts !! GF !! GA !! Standing !! Year !! 1st round !! 2nd round !! 3rd round !! Kelly Cup
|-
| 2018–19 || 72 || 37 || 32 || 2 || 1 || 77 || 221 || 247 || 6th, North || 2019 ||colspan=4|did not qualify
|-
| 2019–20 || 62 || 32 || 26 || 3 || 1 || 68 || 182 || 186 || 4th, North || 2020 ||colspan=4|Season cancelled
|-
| 2020–21 || colspan=9 |Opted out of participating due to the COVID-19 pandemic || 2021 || colspan=4 |did not participate
|-
| 2021–22 || 72 || 33 || 31 || 5 || 3 || 74 || 230 || 236 || 4th, North || 2022
||L, 2–4, REA ||—||—||—

Players

Current roster
Updated November 23, 2022.

References

External links
Maine Mariners website

 
ECHL teams
Ice hockey teams in Maine
Ice hockey clubs established in 2017
2
New York Rangers minor league affiliates
2017 establishments in Maine
Comcast subsidiaries